Zaidi Amel (born ) is an Algerian female volleyball player. She is part of the Algeria women's national volleyball team.

She participated in the 2015 FIVB Volleyball World Grand Prix.
On club level she played for R. C. Bejala in 2014.

References

External links
 Profile at FIVB.org

1995 births
Living people
Algerian women's volleyball players
Place of birth missing (living people)
Middle blockers
21st-century Algerian people